György Lukács de Erzsébetváros (10 September 1865 – 28 September 1950) was a Hungarian politician, who served as Minister of Religion and Education between 1905 and 1906. From 1887 to 1897 he worked for the Ministry of Interior. He suggested to nationalise the institution of parish register. He had significant role in the crush of the peasant movements. He was member of the Diet of Hungary from 1921. During the Regency he was active in the works of the Interparliamentary Union and the League of Nations Union. He served as president of the Hungarian National Fine Art Association and manager chairman of the chauvinist Hungarian Revisionist League party.

References
 Magyar Életrajzi Lexikon

1865 births
1950 deaths
People from Oradea
Education ministers of Hungary
Hungarian people of Armenian descent
Lord-lieutenants of a county in Hungarian Kingdom